Upatissa I was King of Anuradhapura in the 4th century, whose reign lasted from 370 to 412. He succeeded his father Buddhadasa as King of Anuradhapura and was succeeded by his brother Mahanama.

See also
 List of Sri Lankan monarchs
 History of Sri Lanka

References

External links
 Kings & Rulers of Sri Lanka
 Codrington's Short History of Ceylon

Monarchs of Anuradhapura
U
U
U
U